Aileen Wilson (born 30 March 1984) is a British female high jumper, who won an individual gold medal at the Youth World Championships.

References

External links

1994 births
Living people
British female high jumpers